For information on all Lamar University sports, see Lamar Cardinals and Lady Cardinals

The 2019–20 Lamar Cardinals basketball team represented Lamar University during the 2019–20 NCAA Division I men's basketball season. The Cardinals were led by sixth-year head coach Tic Price and played their home games at the Montagne Center in Beaumont, Texas as members of the Southland Conference. They finished the season 17–15, 10–10 in Southland play to finish in a three-way tie for sixth place. They defeated McNeese State in the first round of the Southland tournament and were set to face Nicholls in the second round before the tournament was cancelled amid the COVID-19 pandemic.

Previous season
The Cardinals finished conference play with as 12–6 record in a three-way tie with New Orleans and Southeastern Louisiana for third place.  The team qualified for the 2019 Southland Conference men's basketball tournament as the fifth seeded team.  They won the first-round game against eighth seed Houston Baptist by a score of 81–79. The season ended when the Cardinals were eliminated in the second round by fourth seed New Orleans with a score of 72–76.

Roster 
Sources:

TV and radio media

All Lamar games will be broadcast on KLVI, also known as News Talk 560.

Live video of all home games (except those picked up by Southland Conference TV agreements) will be streamed on ESPN3.

Schedule and results
Sources:

|-
!colspan=12 style=| Non-conference regular season

|-
!colspan=12 style=| Southland Conference regular season

|-
!colspan=12 style=| Southland Tournament

|- style="background:#bbbbbb"
| style="text-align:center"|Mar 12, 20207:30 pm, ESPN+
| style="text-align:center"| (6)
| vs. (3) NichollsSecond round
| colspan=5 rowspan=1 style="text-align:center"|Cancelled due to the COVID-19 pandemic
| style="text-align:center"|Leonard E. Merrell CenterKaty, TX
|-

See also 
2019–20 Lamar Lady Cardinals basketball team

References

Lamar Cardinals basketball seasons
Lamar
Lamar Cardinals basketball
Lamar Cardinals basketball